Coleophora macrura is a moth of the family Coleophoridae. It is found in Uzbekistan.

The larvae feed on the fruit of Arbuscula arbuscula. They create a silky case, consisting of five to six cylindrical sections. The valve is three-sided. The length of the case is 6-6.5 mm and the color is chocolate-brown to yellow, although individual sections may be much darker than others. The initial stage of the construction of the case consists of two fruits glued together. In the intermediate stage, the case is increased with additional silky belts and at the end of the development the fruits are discarded and replaced by a valve. Larvae can be found from September to the beginning of October. Fully fed larvae hibernate.

References

macrura
Moths described in 1972
Moths of Asia